Got Lyrics? is the second solo studio album by American rapper Illogic. It was released in 2001.

Critical reception
Brian O'Neill of AllMusic gave the album 2 stars out of 5, saying, "the production is not very innovative or invigorating." He added: "Get Illogic an innovative producer who's unafraid to take chances and the MC could make some noise, because he certainly has more than enough prowess behind the mic."

Track listing

References

External links
 
 Got Lyrics? at Bandcamp

2001 albums
Illogic albums